Valeria Paula Molinero is an Argentinian physicist who is the Jack and Peg Simons Endowed Professor of Theoretical Chemistry at the University of Utah. Her research investigates the simulation of the behavior of materials. She was awarded the American Physical Society Irving Langmuir Award in Chemical Physics in 2023.

Early life and education 
Molinero was born in Argentina. She earned her undergraduate and doctorate degrees and was a doctoral researcher at the University of Buenos Aires, where she specialized in electrochemistry.

Research and career 
After her PhD, Molinero moved to the California Institute of Technology and Arizona State University for postdoctoral research, working alongside Austen Angell and William Andrew Goddard III.

In 2006, Molinero joined the University of Utah, where she built a research program focused on the use of computer simulations to understand the structure and phase dynamics of materials. Her research has mainly investigated the transition between water and ice, and how the environment in which that transition occurs (e.g. in the production of ice cream, in clouds, in anti-freeze) influences the process.

Molinero has developed simulations to understand the materials properties of zeolites, and to predict the specific polymorph from a synthesis mixture. In 2020, she investigated the smallest limits of ice, showing that in nanodroplets of fewer than 90 molecules of water it is impossible for ice to form.

Awards and honors 
 2005 International Association for the Properties of Water and Steam Helmholtz Award
 2009 Beckman Young Investigator Award
 2019 University of Utah Distinguished Scholarly and Creative Research Award
 2019 Proceedings of the National Academy of Sciences of the United States of America Cozzarelli Prize
 2021 Elected Fellow of the American Association for the Advancement of Science
 2021 Elected Fellow of the American Academy of Arts and Sciences
 2022 Elected a Member of the National Academy of Sciences
 2022 Elected Fellow of the Utah Academy of Engineering and Sciences
 2022 Honorary doctorate from the University of Buenos Aires
 2023 American Physical Society Irving Langmuir Award in Chemical Physics

Selected publications 
 according to Google scholar her most cited publications are:

References 

Year of birth missing (living people)
Living people
Argentine women physicists
21st-century Argentine physicists
21st-century Argentine women scientists
University of Buenos Aires alumni
California Institute of Technology alumni
Arizona State University alumni
University of Utah faculty
Fellows of the American Association for the Advancement of Science
Fellows of the American Academy of Arts and Sciences
Members of the United States National Academy of Sciences
Argentine emigrants to the United States